The 2022–23 All-Ireland Junior Club Football Championship was the 21st staging of the All-Ireland Junior Club Football Championship since its establishment by the Gaelic Athletic Association for the 2001–02 season. The draws for the respective provincial championships took place at various stages between June and September 2022. The championship ran from 22 October 2022 to 15 January 2023.

The All-Ireland final was played on 15 January 2023 at Croke Park in Dublin, between Fossa from Kerry and Stewartstown Harps from Tyrone, in what was their first ever meeting in the final. Fossa won the match by 0-19 to 1-13 to claim their first ever championship title.

Gareth Devlin was the championship's top scorer with 3-27.

Connacht Junior Club Football Championship

Connacht quarter-final

Connacht semi-finals

Connacht final

Leinster Junior Club Football Championship

Leinster first round

Leinster quarter-finals

Leinster semi-finals

Leinster final

Munster Junior Club Football Championship

Munster quarter-finals

Munster semi-finals

Munster final

Ulster Junior Club Football Championship

Ulster preliminary round

Ulster quarter-finals

Ulster semi-finals

Ulster final

Britain Junior Club Football Championship

Britain quarter-finals

Britain semi-finals

Britain Final

All-Ireland Junior Club Football Championship

All-Ireland quarter-final

All-Ireland semi-finals

All-Ireland final

Championship statistics

Top scorers

Overall

In a single game

References

2022 in Irish sport
2023 in Irish sport
All-Ireland Junior Club Football Championship
All-Ireland Junior Club Football Championship